Lester Edward Smith (April 14, 1902 – September 4, 1957) was an American competition swimmer who represented the United States at the 1924 Summer Olympics in Paris.  Smith competed in the men's 400-meter freestyle, advanced to the semifinals, and recorded a time of 5:37.6.

References

External links
 

1902 births
1957 deaths
American male freestyle swimmers
Olympic swimmers of the United States
Swimmers from San Francisco
Swimmers at the 1924 Summer Olympics
20th-century American people